Andreas Schmidt may refer to:

 Andreas Schmidt (actor) (1963–2017), German actor and director
 Andreas Schmidt (artist) (born 1967), German photographer, artist and gallerist
 Andreas Schmidt (baritone) (born 1960), German classical bass-baritone
 Andreas Schmidt (footballer) (born 1973), retired German footballer
 Andreas Schmidt (swimmer) (born 1959), German former swimmer
 Andreas Schmidt (jazz pianist) (born 1967), German pianist, composer and arranger